Southwest Airlines Flight 345 was a scheduled flight from Nashville International Airport, Tennessee, to New York City's LaGuardia Airport. On July 22, 2013, the Boeing 737 operating the route suffered a front landing gear collapse while landing at LaGuardia Airport, injuring 9 people on board. The aircraft, which was worth an estimated $15.5 million at the time, was written off and scrapped as a result of the accident.

Accident

The aircraft landed on runway 4 with its nose landing gear touching down prior to the main landing gear. The aircraft's nose gear collapsed upward into the body of the aircraft, causing substantial damage to the avionics electronics bay in the fuselage.  The aircraft slid  on its nose along the runway, arresting off to the right of the runway pavement.  The plane came to a stop halfway down the runway after skidding on its nose in a sea of sparks.

As a result of the crash, the two-runway airport was closed until its rescue assets were available again. Two hours later, the airport's other runway reopened for traffic.  The airport cleared and inspected the affected runway, and removed the aircraft in time for the earliest next day departures.  Nine occupants were treated for minor injuries, all sustained during evacuation, six of whom were taken to local hospitals.

Aircraft and crew

The aircraft (built in October 1999) was a 13-year-old Boeing 737-700, registration number N753SW, owned and operated by Southwest Airlines.

Flight 345's captain, who was 49 years old, had flown for Southwest Airlines for nearly 13 years, six years in the rank as captain.  At the time of the accident, she had a total of 12,000 hours of flight time, including 2,600 flight hours as captain of a Boeing 737.

The first officer, who was 44 years old, had 20 years of prior experience in the United States Air Force and had been hired by Southwest Airlines a year and a half before the accident.

Investigation 
On July 26, 2013, the National Transportation Safety Board (NTSB) issued a press release disclosing its initial findings, which included:
 The cockpit voice recorder recorded 2 hours of good data, including the full duration of the last flight from Nashville to New York City.
 The flight data recorder provided 27 hours of data, including all parameters for the last flight from Nashville to New York City.
 From the flight data recorder download:
 The flaps were changed from 30 degrees to 40 degrees 56 seconds before touchdown. 
 The aircraft came to rest 19 seconds after touchdown. 
Both the obtained flight data and the available video record have the nose gear making contact with the ground before the main landing gear did, which is the opposite order from the normal landing sequence.

No mechanical malfunctions were found, but the nose landing gear collapsed due to stress overload. The NTSB's investigation became focused on the behavior of the flight crew during Flight 345's approach into LaGuardia Airport. The NTSB discovered that Flight 345's captain had been the subject of multiple complaints by first officers who had flown with her. Analyzing flight recorder data, the NTSB determined that the captain had changed the airplane's flaps from 30 degrees to 40 degrees at an altitude of only . At , the captain observed that the plane was still above the glide slope, and ordered the first officer to "get down" instead of aborting the landing. At an altitude of only  and 3 seconds from touching down, the captain took control of the aircraft from the first officer.

The NTSB ultimately concluded that the crash was due to pilot error. The NTSB determined that the captain's failure to take control until the plane had descended to only  "did not allow her adequate time to correct the airplane's deteriorating energy state and prevent the nose landing gear from striking the runway."

Aftermath
On October 2, 2013, Southwest Airlines announced that it had fired Flight 345's captain.  The airline also announced that it was requiring Flight 345's first officer to undergo additional training. Neither pilot was publicly identified by the airline.

The Boeing 737 involved in the accident, worth an estimated $15.5 million at the time, was found to be too extensively damaged to be repaired and was written off as a total loss.  The aircraft was ultimately removed from LaGuardia Airport via barge to the Port of Albany (New York) in November 2013, where the airframe was broken up by a salvage dealer at the Port of Albany in March 2014, with some parts trucked to Owego for final destruction. The accident represents the third hull loss of a Boeing 737-700.

References

External links 
National Transportation Safety Board

 Full NTSB docket including Cockpit Voice Recorder transcript, Flight Data Recorder readout

2013 in New York City
Accidents and incidents involving the Boeing 737 Next Generation
Airliner accidents and incidents in New York City
LaGuardia Airport
345
July 2013 events in the United States
Airliner accidents and incidents caused by pilot error